The Ternopil Encyclopedic Dictionary is a regional encyclopedia in Ukrainian containing information about the history, geography, culture, economy, administrative structure, and other features of Ternopil Oblast.

Volumes
The encyclopedia has four volumes:
 Volume 1 (2004): А–Й, 696 pages
 Volume 2 (2005): К–О, 706 pages
 Volume 3 (2008): П–Я, 708 pages
 Volume 4 (2010): addenda, 788 pages

Sources
  Тернопільський енциклопедичний словник / редкол.: Г. Яворський та ін. — Тернопіль: видавничо-поліграфічний комбінат «Збруч», 2004–2010. — Т. 1–4.

External links
 Volume 1, Volume 2, Volume 3, Volume 4;

Ternopil Oblast
2004 non-fiction books
2005 non-fiction books
2008 non-fiction books
2010 non-fiction books
Ukrainian-language books
Ukrainian encyclopedias
21st-century encyclopedias